The Golf Federation of Armenia, also known as the National Golf Association of Armenia, is the regulating body of golf in Armenia, governed by the Armenian Olympic Committee. The headquarters of the federation is located in Yerevan.

History
The Federation was established in December 2006 and the current president of the Golf Federation of Armenia is Karen Hovhannisyan. The Federation is a full member of the International Golf Federation and the European Golf Association.

Caucasus Cup
The Caucasus Cup was launched in 2015 by a joint initiative between the golf federations of Armenia and Georgia. The Caucasus Cup format was designed to be similar to the Ryder Cup. The inaugural competition took place in Kachreti, Georgia at the Ambassadori Golf Club, and the 2016 event took place at the Ararat Golf Club in Yerevan, Armenia. The aim of this initiative is to make golf a more popular activity in the Caucasus region.

See also
 Sport in Armenia

References

External links 
 Golf Federation of Armenia on Facebook

Sports governing bodies in Armenia
Golf associations
National members of the International Golf Federation
National members of the European Golf Association